Jens Erik Fenstad (15 April 1935 – 13 April 2020) was a Norwegian mathematician.

Fenstad graduated as mag.scient. from the University of Oslo in 1959, and worked as a research fellow there and at UC Berkeley. He was a professor at the University of Oslo from 1968 to 2003, except for the years 1989 to 1993, when he was vice rector (prorektor). On 29 May 1998 Fensted received an honorary doctorate from the Faculty of 
Science and Technology at Uppsala University, Sweden. He served in the Executive Committee of the Division for Logic, Methodology and Philosophy of Science of the International Union of History and Philosophy of Science as Treasurer from 1975 to 1983 and as President from 1991 to 1995.

He chaired the Norwegian Mathematical Society and the World Commission on Ethics (COMEST) of the UNESCO, and co-founded the Abel Prize. He has also edited the journal Nordisk Matematisk Tidsskrift. He was a member of the Norwegian Academy of Science and Letters.

Fenstad resided in Østerås. He died from COVID-19 on 13 April 2020, two days before his 85th birthday.

See also
Influence of non-standard analysis

References

1935 births
2020 deaths
Norwegian mathematicians
University of Oslo alumni
Academic staff of the University of Oslo
Members of the Norwegian Academy of Science and Letters
Deaths from the COVID-19 pandemic in Norway
Presidents of the Norwegian Mathematical Society